Jay-Z & Ciara Live (also known as Jay-Z Live with Special Guest Ciara), was a 2009 summer concert tour headlined by rapper Jay-Z and R&B singer Ciara. The tour was in support of both artists' new albums, The Blueprint 3 and Fantasy Ride. The six city United States tour took place from July 2 to July 12, 2009. The tour was originally scheduled to have ten dates, but this was later changed to six. The opening act for the tour was rapper Fabolous.

Ciara did not appear at the first tour date for an unknown reason, but she did appear at the second show at The Palms.
The July 12 stop in Atlanta, Georgia was cancelled due to heavy rain.

Setlist
Ciara
Intro
"Like a Boy"
"1, 2 Step"
"Love Sex Magic"
"Never Ever"
"Goodies"
"Oh"
"Promise"
"Work"
Outro
On the Las Vegas stop, Ciara Performed "Like A Surgeon".
Ciara missed the Connecticut stop on July 10 due to catching the flu. 

Jay-Z
Intro
"D.O.A. (Death of Auto-Tune)"
"Say Hello" (snippet)
"Show Me What You Got"
"Blue Magic"
"My President" (remix)
"Takeover" (snippet)/"U Don't Know"
"P.S.A. (Public Service Announcement)"
"I Want You Back" (Michael Jackson Tribute)
"Izzo (H.O.V.A.)
"Allure/Flashing Lights (mashup)
"Diamonds from Sierra Leone" (remix)
"Swagga Like Us"
"Roc Boys (And the Winner Is...)
"What We Talkin' About(snippet)
"Big Pimpin'"
"Dirt Off Your Shoulder"
"Can I Get A..."
"Jigga What, Jigga Who"
"Blueprint 3 Intro (acapella)
"You, Me, Him, Her"
"Lucifer"
"Jigga My Nigga"
"99 Problems"/"Point of Authority" (mashup Linkin Park)
"I Just Wanna Love U (Give It 2 Me)"
"Can I Live Play"
"Where I'm From"
"Money Ain't a Thang"
"Hard Knock Life"
"Encore"
Outro

Tour dates
All tour dates were announced and confirmed on Ciara's official website.

Critical reception
The tour received positive to favorable reviews from critics.

Los Angeles Times gave the whole tour a very positive review, saying Ciara worked hard during her brief set, executing some impressive acrobatics along with her four dancers. Her street-tough image is powerful—she and her dancers wore ripped jeans and leather vests, like a sleeked-up girl gang—but her delivery was unfocused, and she didn't seem to be enjoying herself. And she also sang to tracks, and half the time she lip-synched. The newspaper also gave Jay-Z a positive review saying that his set was exciting and kept the audience very hyped. They also continued saying he interacted with audience very well. As, it's stated Jay-Z shows are fun because the rapper is so adept at spinning liquid gold; his mouth is one of the most nimble in the genre’s history, and he uses it to present thoughts that are sharp, funny and resonant

References

Ciara concert tours
2009 concert tours
Jay-Z concert tours